Jacques-Marie, vicomte Cavaignac (1773–1855) was a French general. He was the brother of Jean Baptiste Cavaignac.

Jacques-Marie served with distinction in the army under the Republic and successive governments. He commanded the cavalry of the XI corps in the retreat from Moscow, and eventually became Vicomte Cavaignac and inspector-general of cavalry.

References

Cavaignac, Jacques-Marie, vicomte
Cavaignac, Jacques-Marie, vicomte
Barons of Barayne
Viscounts of the First French Empire
French commanders of the Napoleonic Wars
Names inscribed under the Arc de Triomphe